The Chiwoo Craft Museum is a crafts museum in Seoul, South Korea. It is named after Chiwoo Cheonwhang (치우천황 蚩尤), a Korean mythical god.

See also
Korean art
List of museums in Seoul
List of museums in South Korea

References

External links
Official site

Buildings and structures in Seocho District
Art museums and galleries in Seoul
Contemporary crafts museums
Art museums established in 2004
2004 establishments in South Korea